Jacques André Marie Jullien (7 May 1929 – 10 December 2012) was the Roman Catholic archbishop of the Roman Catholic Archdiocese of Rennes, France.

Ordained to the priesthood in 1954, Jullien was named bishop in 1978 and resigned in 1998.

Notes

1929 births
2012 deaths
Archbishops of Rennes
Clergy from Brest, France